Shahnaz Sardar is a Awami League Bangladeshi politician and a Member of Bangladesh Parliament from a reserved seat who served from 1996-2001.

Career
Sardar was elected to parliament from reserved seat as an Awami League candidate in 1996 from Seat-03.

References

Awami League politicians
Living people
Women members of the Jatiya Sangsad
7th Jatiya Sangsad members
Year of birth missing (living people)
20th-century Bangladeshi women politicians